Albert Roberts (14 May 1908 – 11 May 2000) was a British Labour politician.

Early years 
Roberts was educated at Whitwood Technical College and worked as a mining engineer and mines inspector for the Yorkshire Safety Board 1941–51. He was elected a councillor on Rothwell Urban District Council 1937–51, serving as chair in 1948.

Parliamentary career 
Roberts was Member of Parliament for Normanton from 1951 to 1983 and was sponsored by the National Union of Mineworkers.  His career was controversial for his support for Francisco Franco, his relationship with the corrupt architect John Poulson and his regular votes in favour of capital punishment.  His successor was Bill O'Brien.

Personal life 
He was vice-chairman of the British branch of the Inter-Parliamentary Union.

See also 
Times Guide to the House of Commons, 1966 and 1979

References

External links 
 

1908 births
2000 deaths
Labour Party (UK) MPs for English constituencies
National Union of Mineworkers-sponsored MPs
Councillors in Leeds
UK MPs 1951–1955
UK MPs 1955–1959
UK MPs 1959–1964
UK MPs 1964–1966
UK MPs 1966–1970
UK MPs 1970–1974
UK MPs 1974
UK MPs 1974–1979
UK MPs 1979–1983